is a railway station in Tsurumi-ku, Yokohama, Kanagawa Prefecture, Japan, operated by East Japan Railway Company (JR East).

Lines
Tsurumi Station is an interchange between the Keihin-Tōhoku Line and the Tsurumi Line (of which it is a terminus), and is 52.0 km from the northern terminus of the Keihin-Tōhoku Line at Ōmiya Station.

Station layout

Tsurumi Station is an elevated station with one island platform for the Keihin-Tōhoku Line, and two opposed side platforms for the Tsurumi Line.

From the north side of the Keihin-Tōhoku Line platform are located, in order, The Tokaido Line passenger train lines in both directions, The Tokaido Line Tokyo-bound freight train tracks, three tracks for trains to stop at overnight, and the Tokaido Line freight train tracks for the direction from Tokyo. None of these have platforms.

Between the Keihin-Tōhoku Line and Tsurumi Line there is a ticket gate, which is a remnant of when the Tsurumi Line was operated by the separate .

There is a Midori no Madoguchi staffed ticket office as well as automatic ticket gates. The Keihin-Tōhoku Line platforms are connected to the concourse by escalators and elevators.

Platforms

History

Tsurumi Station was opened on 15 November 1872, as a station on the Japanese Government Railways (the predecessor to the Japanese National Railways) Tōkaidō Main Line, initially for passenger operations only. Freight services started on 1 April 1898. The Keihin Line began operations to Tsurumi from 20 December 1914. On 23 December 1934, the Tsurumi Rinkō Railway (present-day Tsurumi Line) connected to Tsurumi Station. The station was the location of a major railway accident, the Tsurumi Accident on 9 November 1963. It was one of the five major post-war JNR accidents. Upon the privatization of JNR on 1 April 1987, the station has been operated by JR East.

Passenger statistics
In fiscal 2013, the station was used by an average of 78,272 passengers daily (boarding passengers only), making it the 56th-busiest station operated by JR East. The daily average passenger figures (boarding passengers only) in previous years are as shown below.

Surrounding area
 Sojiji temple
 Tsurumi University
 Tsurumi Ward Office

References

External links

 Tsurumi Station information (JR East) 

Railway stations in Kanagawa Prefecture
Railway stations in Japan opened in 1872
Tōkaidō Main Line
Railway stations in Yokohama